Drew Findling is an American criminal defense lawyer known for representing clients who are hip hop musicians as well as other clients who are publicly known. Based in Atlanta, he is the founding partner of The Findling Law Firm, P.C., which focuses exclusively on federal and state criminal defense, trying cases in state and federal courts around the nation ranging from matters involving complex white-collar crimes to serious violent felonies, as well as regarding international matters.

Education
Findling earned a BA degree in 1981 from Oglethorpe University and graduated with a JD degree from the Emory University School of Law in 1984.

Career
Findling was admitted to the Georgia Bar in 1984 and spent the first three years of his career as a Fulton County public defender during which time he was the first attorney in the nation to successfully present a battered woman syndrome defense based only on verbal abuse.

In 2018, Findling was a featured speaker at the Aspen Ideas Festival, participating in a one-on-one interview with journalist Joshua Johnson on "Hip Hop Collision: Music, Race and The Law."

During 2018-2019, Findley was president of the National Association of Criminal Defense Lawyers (NACDL) and, in 2023, was appointed as a trustee of the NACDL Foundation for Criminal Justice. He has been a recipient of the NACDL's Robert C. Heeney Memorial Award, presented each year to only one criminal defense attorney in the country and, in 2023, was appointed to Board of Advisors for the National Clearinghouse for Science, Technology and the Law.

In 2022, former U.S. President Donald Trump hired Findling to represent him in the ongoing criminal investigation into election interference in Georgia.

Findling uses the hashtag "#BillionDollarLawyer" on his Instagram account.

Awards
In 2018, the The Hollywood Reporter named Findling one of "Hollywood's Top 20 Troubleshooters" and he was also recognized that year as one of "Billboard's R&B/Hip-Hop 100 Power Players".

References

Living people
Georgia (U.S. state) lawyers
Criminal defense lawyers
People from Atlanta
Hip hop activists
Year of birth missing (living people)
Public defenders

External links
 National Criminal Defense College - Drew Findling, Faculty
Drew Findling - Avvo
Drew Findling - Martindale-Hubbell
Drew Findling - Super Lawyers